Littleworth is an area of Cannock Chase District, Staffordshire, England. The area is mainly residential and industrial. It is located between Wimblebury and Hazelslade. There is a bus service that connects the area with Cannock and Burntwood. The nearest railway station is in Cannock. There is also traces of the former mineral line which ran through the area to Norton Junction from the Chase Line. It is traceable from Nelson Drive and can be seen on Google Maps as a row of trees.

References

 
 
 

Populated places in Staffordshire
Cannock Chase District